Sceloporus bimaculosus, the twin-spotted spiny lizard, is a species of lizard in the family Phrynosomatidae. It is found in New Mexico and Texas in the United States and Mexico.

References

Sceloporus
Reptiles of the United States
Reptiles of Mexico
Reptiles described in 1955